Kamandi is a fictional comic book character created by artist Jack Kirby and published by  DC Comics. The bulk of Kamandi's appearances occurred in the comic series Kamandi: The Last Boy on Earth, which ran from 1972 to 1978.

Kamandi is a young hero in a post-apocalyptic future. After a huge event called "The Great Disaster", humans have been reduced back to savagery in a world ruled by intelligent, highly evolved animals.

Publication history

Creators
DC editor Carmine Infantino had tried to acquire the license to publish Planet of the Apes comic books. When this failed to happen, he asked Jack Kirby for a series with a similar concept. Kirby had not seen the films but he knew the rough outline and he had also created a very similar story, "The Last Enemy!", in Harvey Comics' Alarming Tales that predated the original Planet of the Apes novel. He also had an unused comic strip he created in 1956, titled Kamandi of the Caves. Kirby brought all those elements together to create Kamandi. Although his initial plan was to not work on the comic books themselves, the cancellation of Forever People freed him up to do so.

The series
The Kamandi series was launched in October–November 1972, and was written and drawn by Jack Kirby. The book went to a monthly publishing schedule quickly, a sign of its early popularity.

Kirby provided art and story through the comic's 37th issue, in January 1976. Kirby also drew issues #38 through #40, although they were scripted by Gerry Conway. Kirby subsequently left DC, but the series continued, initially written by Conway and drawn by Chic Stone. Later issues were alternately written by Paul Levitz, Dennis O'Neil, David Anthony Kraft, Elliot S. Maggin, and Jack C. Harris, with art by Pablo Marcos, Keith Giffen, and Dick Ayers. It was canceled during the "DC Implosion" of 1978, despite respectable sales figures. The final published issue was #59, cover-dated September–October 1978. Two additional issues, completed but not released, were included in Cancelled Comic Cavalcade #2.

Entering the DC Universe
During Kirby's run on the book, Steve Sherman indicated in the letters column that the series was connected to Kirby's contemporary OMAC series, which was set sometime prior to the Great Disaster. The only explicit connection to the DC Universe occurs in issue #29, where Kamandi discovers a group of apes who worship Superman's costume, and who speak of legends of Superman trying and failing to stop the Great Disaster. The story leaves it ambiguous whether the legends are true, although Kamandi believes Superman was real, and whether the costume is indeed Superman's.

Various non-Kirby stories tie the series more explicitly to the DC Universe. Kamandi met Batman in The Brave and the Bold #120 (July 1975) and #157 (December 1979). Superman #295 (January 1976) establishes that the costume seen in issue #29 was indeed Superman's, and that Earth A.D. is an alternate future for Earth-One, distinct from that of the Legion of Super-Heroes. Issues #49–50 of the series establish that Kamandi's grandfather was the elderly Buddy Blank, hero of the OMAC series, and features a brief return of OMAC's satellite ally, Brother Eye. Kirby's Kamandi story in Cancelled Comic Cavalcade #2 guest stars The Sandman and establishes that Kamandi is Jed Walker.

The 1975–1977 Hercules Unbound series and the OMAC backup stories in Kamandi and The Warlord tie OMAC to both the storyline of Hercules Unbound and to the Atomic Knights, indicating that the Great Disaster was the atomic war of 1986 that precipitated the events of the latter. Superman #295 (Jan. 1976) implied that the Great Disaster was a natural occurrence.

DC Comics Presents #57 (May 1983) reveals that the events of the Atomic Knights stories were a fantasy in the mind of Gardner Grayle, but DC Comics Presents #64 and Crisis on Infinite Earths #2 make clear that Kamandi still existed in an alternate future of Earth-One.

In the wake of the Crisis on Infinite Earths, the Great Disaster did not occur, and the boy who would have become Kamandi instead became Tommy Tomorrow.

Revival
In the aftermath of the Infinite Crisis limited series, a bunker named Command D has been built under the ruins of the city of Blüdhaven.

In early 2007, DC Nation house ads showed a partial picture of Darkseid and mention a "Great Disaster". Additional DC promotional art for the series Countdown show the Statue of Liberty in ruins, similar to Kamandi #1. Dan DiDio later revealed that the Statue's appearance in that teaser ad was a reference to the Sinestro Corps War. Throughout 2007, DC Comics contained continual references to a coming Great Disaster. In Countdown #31, Buddy Blank and his unnamed blond grandson are introduced into the storyline. As of Countdown #6, The Great Disaster is in its early stages on Earth-51 due to the outbreak of a virus, which is causing humans to develop animal-like features, and animals to develop humanoid features. In Countdown #5, the virus claims Earth-51's Buddy Blank's daughter, but his grandson is safe. Una, an alternate Earth's version of the Legion of Super-Heroes Triplicate Girl, gives him her Legion flight ring, which he uses to safely get him to Cadmus' "Command D" facility, which was used to control Brother Eye, and has the defenses necessary to protect them from the virus' victims. As he settles in, he hopes that his grandson can forgive him for making him "the last boy on Earth".

In Countdown: Arena #2, an ape Starman from Earth-17 mentions he is attempting to form a truce between the forces of Kamandi and Ben Boxer, indicating a second variant Kamandi Earth, unlike Earth-51.

Kamandi and The Demon appear in "Devil's Play" written by Joe Kubert and Brandon Vietti with art by Vietti, published in Joe Kubert Presents #6 (May 2013).

Final Crisis

Kamandi is seen in DC's Final Crisis limited series, a sequel to the earlier Crisis on Infinite Earths and Infinite Crisis. In the first issue he appears in what seems to be a time distortion, asking Anthro, the "first" boy on Earth, for the weapon the New God Metron gave him, a reference to the series' opening scene in which Anthro, like Prometheus, is given knowledge in the form of fire. He makes another appearance in the second issue as one of the captives of the evil New Gods alongside Batman, warning the detective character Dan Turpin that they are making slaves of them. In the final issue, he appears on Earth-51 after it has been reconstructed.

DC Rebirth

As part of the DC Rebirth continuity and commemorating the 100th anniversary of Jack Kirby's birth, in January 2017 DC published the first number of The Kamandi Challenge, a 12-part limited series with each issue featuring a new creative team (a total of 12 writers and 12 artists for the miniseries), a concept loosely inspired on 1985's DC Challenge. During the Infinite Frontier Checkmate mini series, it's revealed he founded the organization as an adult named Kingsley Jacobs aka "King".

Writers on the series included Dan Abnett, Peter Tomasi, Jimmy Palmiotti, James Tynion IV, Bill Willingham, Steve Orlando, Marguerite Bennett, Keith Giffen, Tom King, Greg Pak, Rob Williams and Gail Simone while artists were Dale Eaglesham, Neal Adams, Amanda Conner, Carlos D'Anda, Ivan Reis, Philip Tan, Dan Jurgens, Steve Rude, Kevin Eastman, Joe Prado, Walter Simonson and Ryan Sook.

Fictional character biography

In the eponymous series, Kamandi is a teenage boy on a post-apocalyptic Earth which the textual narrative describes as "Earth A.D. (After Disaster)". The Earth has been ravaged by a mysterious calamity called the Great Disaster. The precise nature of the Great Disaster is never revealed in the original series, although it "had something to do with radiation" (in the series' letter column, Jack Kirby and his then-assistant Steve Sherman repeatedly asserted that the Great Disaster was not a nuclear war, a fact confirmed in issue #35). The Disaster wiped out human civilization and a substantial portion of the human population. A few isolated pockets of humanity survived in underground bunkers, while others quickly reverted to pre-technological savagery.

Shortly before the Great Disaster, a scientist at Walter Reed Army Medical Center, Dr. Michael Grant, developed a drug called Cortexin, which stimulated the reasoning abilities of animals. During the Great Disaster, Grant released the experimental animals affected by the drug, and dumped the Cortexin itself into the stream created by a broken water main. In the ensuing days, animals escaping from the National Zoo drank from that stream and became affected by the drug.

By Kamandi's time, an unspecified period after the Great Disaster, the effects of Cortexin and the radiation unleashed by the Great Disaster itself had caused a wide variety of animals (most of them are descendants of escaped zoo animals following the disaster) including but not limited to barracudas, bats, cheetahs, coyotes, crocodiles, dogs, gophers, gorillas, kangaroos, leopards, lions, lizards, pumas, rats, sloths, tigers, and wolves, to become bipedal, humanoid, and sentient, possessing the power of speech. Others animals ranging from dolphins, killer whales, and snakes developed sentience, but retained more or less their original size and form. The newly intelligent animal species, equipped with weapons and technology salvaged from the ruins of human civilization, began to struggle for territory. Horses were apparently not affected, and serve as a means of transportation in the technologically impoverished world of Earth A.D.

By this time, most surviving humans are acting bestial, with very limited reasoning ability. Most have only the most rudimentary ability to speak, although they can be trained. The precise cause of the loss of reasoning ability is ambiguous in the original series. The animals treat humans as beasts, using them for labor or as pets.

Kamandi is the last survivor of the human outpost in the "Command D" bunker near what was once New York City. "Kamandi" is a corruption of "Command D"; it is unclear if Kamandi ever had any other name. Raised by his elderly grandfather, Kamandi has extensive knowledge of the pre-Disaster world, thanks to a library of microfilm and old videos, but he has spent most of his time inside the bunker, and is unaware of the state of the world outside. When his grandfather is killed by a wolf, Kamandi leaves the bunker in search of other human outposts.

He soon discovers that the only other intelligent humans left on Earth are Ben Boxer and his friends Steve and Renzi, a trio of mutants genetically engineered to survive in Earth A.D. He also makes a number of animal friends including Dr. Canus, the canine scientist of Great Caesar (leader of the Tiger Empire) and Caesar's teenage son Tuftan. Later additions to the cast included the alien woman Pyra, the girl Spirit and the consulting detective Mylock Bloodstalker and his associate Doile. Even the most sympathetic animals, however, are nonplussed by Kamandi and Ben's ability to speak.

Kamandi and his friends set out to explore the world of Earth A.D., in hopes of one day restoring humanity to sentience and civilization.

Other versions

Elseworlds
The Elseworlds miniseries Kamandi: At Earth's End was issued in 1993, but had little relation to the Kirby comic except by name. This series was followed up by Superman: At Earth's End, both written by Tom Veitch.

Superman/Batman
In the third story arc of the Superman/Batman series, which showed the heroes traveling through time, they met or fought with, variously, Sgt. Rock, Jonah Hex, Darkseid, and Kamandi.

Superman & Batman: Generations
In Superman & Batman: Generations III #3 (May 2003), one of the stories was set during the century immediately following the 'Great Disaster' engineered by Luthor's robotized brain. It dealt with Superman II, Batman, and other survivors of the technological age dealing with Kamandi-like intelligent animals and overgrown ruins.

Wednesday Comics
Dave Gibbons and Ryan Sook produced a Kamandi serial for Wednesday Comics in 2009. The stories for Wednesday Comics have their own continuity.

The Multiversity
The sixth issue of The Multiversity, titled the "Multiversity Guidebook", features Kamandi on his version of Earth as one of the 52 Earths of the Multiverse. Kamandi is shown searching an ancient ruin in this issue.

In other media

Television
 An animated Kamandi television series was optioned during the late 1970s, but was cancelled before entering the production phase.
 Kamandi appears in Batman: The Brave and the Bold, voiced by Mikey Kelley. This version is a recurring ally of Batman. Additionally, he was likely killed alongside everyone else on his planet after Joker destroyed it in "Joker: The Vile and the Villainous!", but later appears in the series finale "Mitefall!", in the fourth-wall-breaking final scene where most of the heroes who appeared in the series hold a party for the show's cancellation.
 Kamandi is mentioned in The CW's live-action Arrowverse series The Flash. In the episode "Failure Is An Orphan" of the series' fifth season, Eobard Thawne / Reverse-Flash tells Nora West-Allen / XS that he has been tracking the timeline "from Anthro the first boy to Kamandi the last".

Films
 Kamandi appears in the DC Showcase short Kamandi: The Last Boy on Earth!, voiced by Cameron Monaghan. He is tested by a group of apes to see if he is the "mighty one" (Superman).

Toys
 Kamandi was included in DC Universe Classics Wave 14, released in 2010.

Miscellaneous
 A DC animated universe version of Kamandi appears in the comic book Justice League Adventures #30, and is aided by the Flash.

Collected editions
 Kamandi Archive:
 Volume 1 collects Kamandi: The Last Boy on Earth #1-10, 224 pages, October 2005, 
 Volume 2 collects Kamandi: The Last Boy on Earth #11-20, 228 pages, February 2007, 
 Countdown Special: Kamandi, the Last Boy on Earth 80-Page Giant #1 collects Kamandi: The Last Boy on Earth #1, #10 and #29.
 Kamandi by Jack Kirby Omnibus 
 Volume 1 collects Kamandi: The Last Boy on Earth #1-20, 448 pages, September 2011, 
 Volume 2 collects Kamandi: The Last Boy on Earth #21-40, 424 pages, December 2012, 
 Wednesday Comics collects Wednesday Comics #1-12, 200 pages, June 2010, 

See also
 Jack Kirby bibliography
 Kipo and the Age of Wonderbeasts'': A webcomic and an animated television series, premiering in 2020, with a similar premise focusing on a girl with unusual physical abilities.

References

External links

Kamandi at the DC Database Project
Kamandi at Mike's Amazing World of Comics

1978 comics endings
Characters created by Jack Kirby
Comics by Jack Kirby
Comics characters introduced in 1972
DC Comics male superheroes
DC Comics titles
Defunct American comics
Post-apocalyptic comics
Superhero comics